is a Japanese former football player.

Club statistics

References

External links

1981 births
Living people
Aoyama Gakuin University alumni
People from Zushi, Kanagawa
Association football people from Kanagawa Prefecture
Japanese footballers
J1 League players
J2 League players
Japan Football League players
Nagoya Grampus players
FC Gifu players
Matsumoto Yamaga FC players
Association football midfielders